"Goodbye, Dolly Gray" is a music hall song, with lyrics by American Will D. Cobb and music by American Paul Barnes, first published in 1897 by the Morse Music Publishing Company (Theodore F. Morse). The song was the publishers' first hit.

History 
The song was popularised as a Boer War anthem, but it was actually written during the earlier Spanish–American War.

Discography 
A notable early recording on a 78 rpm record was made in 1901 by Canadian singer Harry Macdonough. In the same year another popular version came out by the Big Four Quartette with vocal group members Arthur Collins, Byron Harlan, Joe Natus and A.D. Madeira (Edison 7728). It featured in Noël Coward's 1931 play Cavalcade and in the movies Lawrence of Arabia (1962), Alfie (1966) and Butch Cassidy and the Sundance Kid (1969). The tune (with different lyrics) is also used in the modern day as "Good Old Collingwood Forever", the club song of the Australian Football League's Collingwood Football Club.

"Goodbye, Dolly Gray" was also recorded by Bruce Lacey and the Alberts in the 1960s, and a modern recording by Stan LePard was featured on Xbox Live Arcade game Toy Soldiers as an opening menu theme.

Lyrics 
I have come to say goodbye, Dolly Gray,
It's no use to ask me why, Dolly Gray,
There's a murmur in the air, you can hear it everywhere,
It's the time to do and dare, Dolly Gray.

So if you hear the sound of feet, Dolly Gray,
Sounding through the village street, Dolly Gray,
It's the tramp of soldiers' true in their uniforms so blue,
I must say goodbye to you, Dolly Gray.

Goodbye Dolly I must leave you, though it breaks my heart to go,
Something tells me I am needed at the front to fight the foe,
See - the boys in blue are marching and I can no longer stay,
Hark - I hear the bugle calling, goodbye Dolly Gray.

Notes and references

Notes

References

External links
 Goodbye, Dolly Gray Tune & Lyrics

American songs
Music hall songs